Edward Fletcher (1807 – 21 December 1889) was an English engineer, and locomotive superintendent of the North Eastern Railway (NER).  He was born at Elsdon in Northumberland.

Career
He was apprenticed to George Stephenson beginning in 1825 and helped with the construction of Stephenson's Rocket and the Canterbury and Whitstable Railway. He helped with the construction of the York and North Midland Railway, and then became locomotive superintendent of the Newcastle and Darlington Junction Railway in 1845.  When the N&DJR became part of the North Eastern Railway in 1854, Fletcher became its locomotive superintendent until his retirement in 1882.  He was succeeded by Alexander McDonnell.

Locomotive designs
Fletcher's locomotive designs for the North Eastern Railway included:
NER Bogie Tank Passenger
NER 901 Class 2-4-0
NER 1001 Class 0-6-0

Family
His nephew was the engineer James Holden.

See also
 Locomotives of the North Eastern Railway

References

External links 
 Edward Fletcher LNER Cyclopedia
 Edward Fletcher & Henry Tennant Steamindex

1807 births
1889 deaths
Locomotive superintendents
English railway mechanical engineers
British railway pioneers
North Eastern Railway (UK) people
19th-century British businesspeople